is a Japanese racing driver. He has competed in such series as the Japanese Touring Car Championship, Deutsche Tourenwagen Masters and Formula Nippon.

Racing record

Complete Japanese Formula 3 results
(key) (Races in bold indicate pole position) (Races in italics indicate fastest lap)

Complete Japanese Formula 3000 Championship/Formula Nippon results 
(key) (Races in bold indicate pole position) (Races in italics indicate fastest lap)

Complete Japanese Touring Car Championship (1994-) results
(key) (Races in bold indicate pole position) (Races in italics indicate fastest lap)

Complete JGTC/Super GT Results 
(key) (Races in bold indicate pole position) (Races in italics indicate fastest lap)

Complete Deutsche Tourenwagen Masters results 
(key) (Races in bold indicate pole position) (Races in italics indicate fastest lap)

† - Driver did not finish, but completed 90% of the race distance.

References

External links
 Career statistics from Driver Database

1968 births
Living people
People from Osaka Prefecture
Japanese racing drivers
Japanese Formula 3 Championship drivers
Japanese Touring Car Championship drivers
Japanese Formula 3000 Championship drivers
Formula Nippon drivers
Deutsche Tourenwagen Masters drivers
Super GT drivers
World Sportscar Championship drivers
Sports car racing team owners
Mercedes-AMG Motorsport drivers
Kondō Racing drivers
Mugen Motorsports drivers
Team Aguri drivers